Argestina is a butterfly genus of the Satyrinae. The genus is confined to the Palearctic. All the species are from China and Tibet.

Species
Argestina phantasta  Goltz, 1938 Yunnan
Argestina pomena  (Evans, 1915)
A. p. shuana  (Evans, 1915) Tibet
A. p. chiuna  (Bailey, 1935)  Tibet
Argestina inconstans  (South, 1913)  Tibet
Argestina irma  Evans, 1923  Tibet
Argestina karta  Riley, 1923 Tibet
Argestina nitida  Riley, 1923 Tibet
Argestina waltoni  (Elwes, 1906) Tibet

References
"Argestina Riley, 1923" at Markku Savela's Lepidoptera and Some Other Life Forms

Satyrini
Butterfly genera
Taxa named by Norman Denbigh Riley